Lasiothyris guanana is a species of moth of the family Tortricidae. It is found on the British Virgin Islands.

The wingspan is about 7 mm. The ground colour of the forewings is white, the basal part of the costa suffused with brownish and the terminal area of the wing with pale ochreous yellow. The markings are brownish yellow. The hindwings are brownish white.

Etymology
The species name refers to Guana Island, the type locality.

References

Moths described in 2007
Cochylini